The Indian locomotive class WDM-6 is a class of Diesel locomotive that was developed in 1981 by Banaras Locomotive Works (BLW), Varanasi for Indian Railways. The model name stands for broad gauge (W), Diesel (D), Mixed traffic (M) engine, 6th generation (6). They entered service in 1981. A total of 2 WDM-6 was built at between 1981 and 1982. They were decommissioned at Burdwan (BWN) in 2011.

History 
WDM-6 was developed to address the need for locomotive to haul commuter and suburban services. They had the same 1350 hp engine and hood superstructure as the YDM-4 locos with WDM-2 under frame. but these locos were underpowered and subsequently relegated to shunting and departmental duties. They were based at the diesel locomotive shed in Burdwan (BWN) since 1980s. One unit was seen shunting at Liluah Workshop. 
By late 2010s they were withdrawn from services. Both units are earmarked for preservation.

Preserved Examples

Former shed 

Barddhaman/Burdwan (BWN): All the locomotives of this class has been withdrawn from service.

See also

 Rail transport in India#History
 List of diesel locomotives of India
 Rail transport in India
 Indian locomotive class WDM-2

References

Bibliography

Bo-Bo locomotives
Railway locomotives introduced in 1970
5 ft 6 in gauge locomotives
Diesel-hydraulic locomotives of India
Banaras Locomotive Works locomotives